Johan Felipe Vásquez Ibarra (born 22 October 1998) is a Mexican professional footballer who plays as a centre-back for  club Cremonese, on loan from Genoa, and the Mexico national team.

Club career
After a couple of years in Pumas UNAM academy, Vásquez first joined Tigres UANL youth academy in 2015. He then briefly transferred to Poblado Miguel Alemán FC in 2016 before settling in Cimarrones de Sonora, successfully going through the ranks until reaching the first team and making his professional debut in the Ascenso MX.

In April 2018, Vásquez joined Monterrey on a two-year loan deal with the option to buy. He was eventually purchased by Monterrey for US$2 million, making him the most expensive transfer between the top two levels of Mexican football.

In December 2019, Vásquez joined UNAM on loan with the option to buy. Two months later, following impressive performances, 50 percent of his rights were purchased by UNAM.

On 16 August 2021, Vásquez joined Serie A club Genoa on a season-long loan with an obligation to buy after one played match. On 17 October, Vásquez made his debut with the team in a league match against Sassuolo, scoring the equalizing goal for his team for a 2–2 draw.

On 18 June 2022, Vásquez moved to recently promoted Cremonese on loan with an option to buy.

International career

Youth
Vásquez began his international career with the under-23 side, featuring at the 2019 Pan American Games where Mexico won the bronze medal. He also participated at the 2020 CONCACAF Olympic Qualifying Championship, scoring one goal in five appearances, where Mexico won the competition. He was included in the tournament's Best XI. Vásquez was subsequently called up to participate in the 2020 Summer Olympics. He won the bronze medal with the Olympic team.

Senior
On 2 October 2019, Vásquez made his senior national team debut in a friendly against Trinidad & Tobago. He came on as a substitute replacing Paolo Yrizar in the 63rd minute in Mexico's 2–0 win.

In October 2022, Vásquez was named in Mexico's preliminary 31-man squad for the 2022 FIFA World Cup, and in November, he was ultimately included in the final 26-man roster, but did not receive any minutes on the field during the tournament.

Career statistics

Club

International

Honours
Monterrey
Liga MX: Apertura 2019
CONCACAF Champions League: 2019

Mexico U23
Pan American Bronze Medal: 2019
CONCACAF Olympic Qualifying Championship: 2020
Olympic Bronze Medal: 2020

Individual
Liga MX Best XI: Guardianes 2020
CONCACAF Olympic Qualifying Championship Best XI: 2020

References

External links

1998 births
Living people
Mexican footballers
Mexico international footballers
Association football defenders
Cimarrones de Sonora players
C.F. Monterrey players
Club Universidad Nacional footballers
Genoa C.F.C. players
U.S. Cremonese players
Ascenso MX players
Liga MX players
Serie A players
Mexican expatriate footballers
Expatriate footballers in Italy
Footballers from Sonora
People from Navojoa
Pan American Games medalists in football
Pan American Games bronze medalists for Mexico
Footballers at the 2019 Pan American Games
Medalists at the 2019 Pan American Games
Footballers at the 2020 Summer Olympics
Olympic footballers of Mexico
Olympic medalists in football
Olympic bronze medalists for Mexico
Medalists at the 2020 Summer Olympics
2022 FIFA World Cup players